Thomas Fielder Bowie (April 7, 1808 – October 30, 1869) was an American politician who served in office from 1842 to 1859.

Early life 
Born in Queen Anne, in Prince George's County, Maryland, Bowie attended Charlotte Hall Military Academy in St. Mary's County, Maryland and Princeton College. In 1826, Bowie was elected to the New York Alpha of Phi Beta Kappa. He graduated from Union College in Schenectady, New York in 1827. While at Union College, Bowie helped found the Sigma Phi fraternity on March 4, 1827. He studied law, was admitted to the bar in 1829, and commenced practice in Upper Marlboro, Maryland. Bowie was a slave owner.

Political career 
He served as deputy attorney general for Prince George's County from 1833 to 1842, and as a member of the Maryland House of Delegates from 1842 to 1846.  He was an unsuccessful candidate for Governor of Maryland in 1843, and was an unsuccessful candidate for election in 1850 to the Thirty-second Congress. However, Bowie served as a member of the State constitutional convention in 1851, as member of the judicial committee assisting in framing the State's new constitution, and as presidential elector on the Whig ticket in 1852.  In 1854 and 1856, Bowie was elected from the sixth district of Maryland as a Democrat to the Thirty-fourth and Thirty-fifth Congresses, serving from March 4, 1855, to March 3, 1859.  He was an unsuccessful candidate for re-nomination in 1858 to the Thirty-sixth Congress.  After Congress, he resumed the practice of his profession.

Death 
He died in Upper Marlboro and is interred in the Waring family burying ground at Mount Pleasant, near Upper Marlboro.

Further reading

References

External links

1808 births
1869 deaths
Bowie family
Democratic Party members of the Maryland House of Delegates
Princeton University alumni
People from Prince George's County, Maryland
Union College (New York) alumni
Democratic Party members of the United States House of Representatives from Maryland
People from Upper Marlboro, Maryland
College fraternity founders
Sigma Phi
19th-century American politicians